Sabatinca pluvialis is a species of moth belonging to the family Micropterigidae. It is endemic to New Zealand and is only known from Secretary Island. Adults of this species are on the wing from the middle of December until the middle of January. The larval host species is the liverwort Pseudomarsupidium piliferum. This species is as  "Data Deficient" under the New Zealand Threat Classification System.

Taxonomy 
This species was first described by George Gibbs in 2014. The male holotype specimen was collected by Gibbs at Grono Spur on Secretary Island and is held in the New Zealand Arthropod Collection.

Description 
Gibbs described the species as follows:

As at 2014 the female of this species is unknown.

Distribution

This species is endemic to New Zealand and is only known from Secretary Island in Fiordland. It has the most restrictive range of the known species of Sabatinca in New Zealand. This species first became known to science when John Grehan collected a specimen in 1982. C. F. Butcher subsequently collected larvae now known to of this species.

Behaviour 
As at 2014 adults of this species are known to be on the wing from the middle of December until the middle of January but it has been hypothesised that their flight period is likely to be of a longer duration.

Host species 
Larvae of this species have been collected from the trunks of trees in the genus Nothofagus, upon which liverworts flourish as a result of the frequent rain that falls on the west coast and its off lying islands of New  Zealand. The larvae were found to be hosted by the liverwort Pseudomarsupidium piliferum.

Conservation status
This species is classified as  "Data Deficient" under the New Zealand Threat Classification System.

References

Micropterigidae
Moths described in 2014
Endemic fauna of New Zealand
Moths of New Zealand
Taxa named by George Gibbs
Endemic moths of New Zealand